is a railway station in the Asakusa district of Taitō, Tokyo, Japan, operated by Tobu Railway, Tokyo Metro, and Toei Subway. It formed one terminus of the original subway line in Tokyo, now the Ginza Line.

Station layout
There is a connecting passage from the Tobu station to the Tokyo Metro station, and a connecting passage from the Tokyo Metro portion to the Toei portion. However, there are no direct connecting passages from the Toei portion to the Tobu portion or from the Tsukuba Express station to the rest of the station complex. Passengers wishing to transfer between the Toei and the Tobu stations have to walk at street level, while passengers transferring between the Tsukuba Express station and the rest of the complex must also walk at street level, as the Tsukuba Express station is located 600 meters to the west of the station complex.

Tobu Railway

The Tobu Railway terminal is a surface station, which occupies a portion of the Matsuya Department Store. The station is used by local and limited express trains. Although Asakusa is the most "central" terminal of the Isesaki Line, it is connected to the next major terminal, Kita-Senju Station, by a length of track with sharp curves, beginning with the first stretch leaving the station, where trains have to turn 90 degrees to the right at a maximum speed of 15 km/h to cross the Sumida River. In part due to the station's somewhat awkward location, many express and semi-express services on the Skytree Line run through Kita-Senju to the Tokyo Metro Hanzomon Line and Tokyo Metro Hibiya Line rather than continue to Asakusa.

Platforms

Tokyo Metro

The Tokyo Metro station is located underground to the south of the Tobu terminal.

Platforms

Toei

The Toei station is located underground to the south of the Tokyo Metro station.

Platforms

History

This was renamed "Asakusa Station" on 1 October 1945.

The Toei Asakusa station opened on 4 December 1960 as part of the Toei Asakusa Line from Oshiage Station.

The station facilities of the Ginza Line were inherited by Tokyo Metro after the privatization of the Teito Rapid Transit Authority (TRTA) in 2004.

PASMO smart card coverage at this station began operation on 18 March 2007.

See also
 List of railway stations in Japan

References

External links

 Asakusa Station information  (Tobu) 
 Asakusa Station information (Tokyo Metro) 
 Asakusa Station information (Toei) 

Railway stations in Japan opened in 1927
Railway stations in Tokyo
Asakusa Station
Asakusa Station
Asakusa Station
Asakusa Station
Asakusa Station
Asakusa Station
Asakusa
Art Deco architecture in Japan